Jack Dickin (10 February 1899 – 1966) was a British swimmer. He competed in the men's 100 metre freestyle event at the 1920 Summer Olympics.

His brother is Albert Dickin.

References

External links
 

1899 births
1966 deaths
British male swimmers
Olympic swimmers of Great Britain
Swimmers at the 1920 Summer Olympics
Place of birth missing
British male freestyle swimmers